Haematosaurus is an extinct genus of teleosaurid thalattosuchian. Fossils have been found from Boulogne-sur-Mer in northern France of Jurassic age. It was originally thought to be a plesiosaur, and the type species was initially assigned to the genus Plesiosaurus in 1874, although it was later reassigned to the new genus in 1934. It is now known to have been a marine crocodylomorph. Due to the fragmentary nature of the material associated with the genus, it is currently regarded as a nomen dubium.

References

External links
Haematosaurus in the Paleobiology Database

Prehistoric reptile genera
Prehistoric marine crocodylomorphs
Jurassic crocodylomorphs
Jurassic reptiles of Europe
Boulogne-sur-Mer